Marc Jorgenson is a Canadian multimedia artist, electronics inventor, writer, musician and recording engineer.

Jorgenson is known for his pioneering work exchanging music files over the early internet in 1983.
He presented his findings and file-sharing vision at Digicon '85: International Arts Conference on Computers
and Creativity.

In 1988 he founded MIDI City Studios, an influential Vancouver-based recording studio that helped
launch the careers of several Juno award-winning recording artists. He is best known as a sound designer contributing to several video games a feature film and dozens of toys and e-books.

Patents
Inventor
 – Hand-held sound generating device

Video games

Engineering – Speech Engine
(2001) NBA Street, Electronic Arts, Inc.

Design & Development: Audio
(2001) NBA Live 2001, Electronic Arts, Inc.
(2000) Rock the Rink, Electronic Arts, Inc.
(2000) FIFA 2000, Electronic Arts, Inc.
(2000) Triple Play 2000, Electronic Arts, Inc.
(1999) NBA Live 99, Electronic Arts, Inc.

Books
Design & Development:  Electronics/Audio

Radio Singles
(1994) "Frozen in Time" - The Marc Jorgenson Project

Films
Sound Design, Foley, Voice Actor

(1992) Maniac Warriors, North American Pictures.

References

External links

 
 The New York Times Movies

Living people
Canadian electronic musicians
Canadian people of Danish descent
Year of birth missing (living people)